Carlos Roberto Jatobá, known as Jatobá (born 2 January 1963) is a Brazilian retired footballer.

Club career
Born in Peabiru, Jatobá initially played with Grêmio Maringá. However, it was during his spell at Pinheiros (PR) that he became noticed (Pinheiros will join Colorado in December 1989, and form Paraná Clube).  He was declared the revelation of thechampionship and elected the best fourth defender of the Campeonato Paranaense and in September 1986 Corinthians brought him. and became part of what was known as the reactionary generation of Corinthians. In 1987–88 he joined recently promoted Spanish La Liga side Celta de Vigo but failed to make any appearance in the league. He returned to Brasil and played with Coritiba in 1989, and also Atlético Goianiense, Latter played with América Mineiro in 1990.

In the season 1990–91 he joined Serbian club FK Spartak Subotica along two other fellow Brazilians, Marquinhos and Oswaldo Monteiro, becoming the first Brazilians to play in the Yugoslav First League. Spartak was not performing as expected and after one league appearance Jatobá was back in Brasil joining Grêmio Catanduvense.  But his return home was short, in 1991 he will be moving back to Europe again, this time to Belgium joining Lokeren.

In 1992, he joined Atlético Paranaense and played the following three years with them, except a half-season spell in 1993 with Botafogo.

After retiring, Jatobá became players agent and lives between Curitiba and Europe. His niece Simone Jatobá also became a professional footballer.

Honors
Pinheiros
Campeonato Paranaense: 1984

Coritiba
Campeonato Paranaense: 1989

Botafogo
Copa CONMEBOL: 1993

References

1963 births
Living people
Sportspeople from Paraná (state)
Brazilian footballers
Brazilian expatriate footballers
Association football defenders
Grêmio de Esportes Maringá players
Esporte Clube Pinheiros (PR) players
Sport Club Corinthians Paulista players
Coritiba Foot Ball Club players
Atlético Clube Goianiense players
América Futebol Clube (MG) players
Grêmio Catanduvense de Futebol players
Club Athletico Paranaense players
Botafogo de Futebol e Regatas players
RC Celta de Vigo players
Expatriate footballers in Spain
FK Spartak Subotica players
Yugoslav First League players
Expatriate footballers in Yugoslavia
K.S.C. Lokeren Oost-Vlaanderen players
Expatriate footballers in Belgium